Bijou is a live album by jazz saxophonist Archie Shepp recorded in Paris, France, in 1975 and released on the French Musica Records label.

Track listing
All compositions by Archie Shepp
 "Big Foot"
 "Hommage a Sidney Bechet"
 "The Inner City"
 "A Little Tune"
Recorded in Paris, France, on October 25, 1975

Personnel
Archie Shepp – tenor saxophone, soprano saxophone, piano
Arthur Jones – alto saxophone
Zusaan  – vocals

References

1976 live albums
Archie Shepp live albums
Musica Records albums